Hurricane Saturday is a one-off programming block of a three-way, two-hour crossover event on NBC which involved three television sitcoms created by Susan Harris: The Golden Girls, Empty Nest and Nurses. The event depicts a fictional hurricane storming into the storylines of the three series set in Miami, Florida. The episodes aired back-to-back on Saturday, November 9, 1991 from 8:00 to 10:00 p.m. EST.

Plot

The event begins on The Golden Girls one-hour episode "The Monkey Show" (season 7, episodes 8 and 9) as a hurricane threatens Miami, Dorothy discovers that ex-husband Stan is "moving on" with her sister Gloria, while Blanche and Rose host a telethon to save a lighthouse. Dorothy later catches Gloria with Stan in her bed, then learns that Sophia pushed Stan and Gloria together. As the storm intensifies, Dorothy and Sophia get into an argument and Sophia goes out into the hurricane. Carol Weston (from Empty Nest) is featured in the second part of the episode on a date with Stan's psychiatrist Dr. Halperin when he is called to the girls' house to help Stan with a problem.

The event continues on the Empty Nest episode "Windy" (season 4, episode 8) as Dr. Harry Weston and his daughters, Carol and Barbara, prepare to move to a new house when the hurricane hits and brings back a lot of memories for them. Meanwhile, Laverne's mother-in-law visits and Sophia Petrillo (from The Golden Girls) stops by to warn the Westons about the impending hurricane.

The event ends on the Nurses episode "Begone with the Wind" (season 1, episode 9) as chaos breaks out at the hospital during the hurricane – the kitchen is flooded, the phones are out and the roads are closed. When Rose Nylund (from The Golden Girls) shows up to help, she is immediately stuck with Julie and the duo are assigned to gathering food from the patients – food that they later give to Laverne Todd (from Empty Nest) for the pediatrics ward. When the news arrives that the roof collapsed in a burning building, Annie fears that her husband, a fireman, may have been killed; Sandy runs into a man (whom she dumped) with a broken leg; Hank and Gina get trapped in an elevator and share a romantic moment; two rival gangs start a knife-fight in front of the nurses' station (and threaten Rose) so it's Paco to the rescue.

Cast

Episodes

See also

Full Moon Over Miami – another crossover event involving three NBC sitcoms: The Golden Girls, Empty Nest and Nurses
Night of the Hurricane – a similar crossover event involving three Fox animated series: Family Guy,  American Dad! and The Cleveland Show

External links
The Golden Girls: "The Monkey Show" on IMDb
Empty Nest: "Windy" on IMDb
Nurses: "Begone with the Wind" on IMDb

The Golden Girls
Crossover television
1991 American television episodes